Colin Ray Jackson,  (born 18 February 1967) is a Welsh former sprint and hurdling athlete who specialised in the 110 metres hurdles.  During a career in which he represented Great Britain and Wales, he won an Olympic silver medal, became world champion twice, world indoor champion once, was undefeated at the European Championships for 12 years and was twice Commonwealth champion. His world record of 12.91 seconds for the 110 m hurdles stood for over 10 years and his 60 metres hurdles world record stood for nearly 27 years.

Biography
Jackson won his first major medal, a silver, in the 110 m hurdles, aged 19 at the 1986 Commonwealth Games. He soon established himself on the global scene, taking bronze at the 1987 World Championships in Athletics and a silver medal at the 1988 Summer Olympics. After winning another silver in the 60 m hurdles at the 1989 IAAF World Indoor Championships, he won European and Commonwealth gold medals in 1990. The 1993 season saw him reach the pinnacle of his sport: after a silver at the 1993 Indoor Worlds, he set a world record of 12.91 seconds to become the 1993 World Champion. This record was unbeaten for almost 13 years and remains the world championship record. Jackson was part of the British 4×100 metres relay team which won the world silver medal.

This period was Jackson's most successful: he had a streak of 44 races undefeated between 1993 and 1995. In addition to European and Commonwealth golds outdoors in 1994, he set another world record, running 7.30 seconds in the 60 m hurdles. A double gold at the 1994 European Athletics Indoor Championships in the 60 m hurdles and sprint events saw him set a European record of 6.49 seconds over 60 m. Injury affected his 1995–1996 seasons and he finished only fourth at the 1996 Olympics. He returned to competition in 1997 and took silver twice – at the Indoor World Championships and the World Outdoors. After winning the European Championships for a third consecutive time in 1998 he became indoor and outdoor World champion in 1999. He finished fifth at the 2000 Summer Olympics and his last major medals came in 2002, taking European indoor and outdoor gold and a Commonwealth silver.

After a period of sports management and coaching, he now works as a sports commentator for athletics and as a television presenter (predominantly for the BBC). He is a well-known face on British television, having been on Strictly Come Dancing in 2005, as well as a number of other entertainment and factual TV programmes.

Early life 
Jackson, born in Cardiff, South Wales, is of Jamaican Maroon, Taíno, and Scottish ancestry. He is the brother of actress Suzanne Packer who played Tess Bateman in the BBC One hospital drama Casualty. Jackson grew up in Birchgrove, attending Springwood Primary School and then Llanedeyrn High School. He played football and cricket for the county and rugby union and basketball for his school and joined the athletics club Birchgrove Harriers, which nurtured his talent. As captain of his school cricket team, he and four team-mates were invited to trials for the Welsh national cricket team: whilst his team-mates were all picked, Jackson was passed over – he attributed this to racism, and has said it resulted in him quitting the sport and focusing on athletics, as "athletics had more people that looked like me". Jackson has also stated he felt discriminated against by British Athletics for selections and sponsorship. He said: "I felt the discrimination was because I was Welsh more than anything else."

Athletics career 
Under coach and close friend Malcolm Arnold, Jackson started out as a promising decathlete before switching to high hurdles. He won gold at the 1986 World Junior Championships and he soon switched to the senior ranks. Following a silver medal in the 1986 Commonwealth Games, he won the 110m hurdles silver at the 1988 Olympic Games behind Roger Kingdom. Although his career as an active competitor in the event would last a further fifteen years, the last ten of these as world record holder, and see him twice crowned World Champion, twice Commonwealth Champion and four times European Champion, this would remain his only Olympic medal of any colour. In 1992 he eased through his first round heat in 13.10 s (which proved faster than the Gold-medal winning time) but was restricted by an injury he picked up during the next round and could only finish seventh in the final, and in 1996 he came fourth and in 2000, fifth.

He set his world record for the 110 metres hurdles on 20 August 1993, winning his first World Championships gold medal in Stuttgart, Germany in 12.91 s. The new mark (also a championship record) shaved 0.01 s off the previous record held by Kingdom and stood for nearly thirteen years, only being equalled by Liu Xiang in the 2004 Summer Olympics and finally beaten by the same man on 11 July 2006 at the Super Grand Prix in Lausanne with a time of 12.88 s. Jackson remained the sole holder of the indoor world record at the 60 metres hurdles with a time of 7.30 seconds set in Sindelfingen, Germany on 6 March 1994 until February 2021. At the 1994 European Indoor Championships he became a double European champion: winning in both the 60 metres hurdles and 60 metres sprint race as well. His 60 m dash time of 6.49 s was a European record, as well as a championship record. These records remained unbeaten for 5 years, when Jason Gardener ran 6.46 s in 1999 in Maebashi, Japan.

The aforementioned achievements coincided with one of the high points of Jackson's career: he was unbeaten between 29 August 1993 and 9 February 1995. He won forty-four races consecutively in this period. His winning time at the 1994 Commonwealth Games was a Commonwealth Games record.

Jackson was a master of the "dip" – the skill of leaning forward at the end of a race to advance the position of the shoulders and improve times (and potentially positions). He was also renowned for being a particularly fast starter, which led to a great deal of success in 60m events. Jackson's technical hurdling ability distinguished him from his peers whether they were faster than him or not.

He was the subject of controversy in 1998 when he decided to run for cash in Tokyo, Japan, rather than compete in the Commonwealth Games for Wales.

Six years after his first world title, Jackson regained his 110m hurdles crown at the 1999 Seville World Championships. This was to be his last gold medal at the very highest level, but he added a final, fourth successive European Championships gold in the 2002 Munich European Championships, extending an unbroken reign as European Champion stretching back to 1990.

Post-retirement career 

Since ending his athletics career at the 2003 World Indoor Championships Jackson has been involved in numerous endeavours, in athletics and other areas. He coached his close friend the swimmer Mark Foster until Foster's retirement in April 2016. He has coached two of Wales best Olympic prospects, 400m runner Timothy Benjamin and 400m hurdler Rhys Williams. He was also one of the members of the successful London 2012 Olympic bid team and is a key member of the BBC's televisions athletics coverage. However, he started his broadcasting career in 2004 by co-hosting, with Sally Gunnell, the BBC reality TV programme Born to Win.

Already the holder of the MBE that he received in 1990 for his services to athletics, in 2000 he was promoted to OBE and then in 2003 to a CBE.

The English reggae band Aswad name-checked him on their 1994 hit song "Shine": Him a floating like a butterfly, the hurdling man – Yes, me-a-chat about Colin Jackson.

Jackson has written three books: the first, The Young Track and Field Athlete, was published in March 1996 by Dorling Kindersley; his second, Colin Jackson: The Autobiography, was published in April 2004 by BBC Books; and his last, Life's New Hurdles, was published in March 2008 by Accent Press Ltd as part of the Quick Reads Initiative.

Since 2014 Jackson has been the race director of the Wings for Life World Run.

In December 2018 it was announced that Jackson was to become Chancellor of Wrexham Glyndŵr University.

In July 2022 he participated in the Commonwealth Games Queen's Baton Relay, carrying the baton into Basildon Sporting Village.

Media career 
After retiring from athletics, he became the face of BBC Raise Your Game with Colin Jackson in which he talked to high-profile international stars about the importance of learning. Participants included Luol Deng, Jenson Button, Davina McCall, and stars from Strictly Come Dancing, to name but a few.

His work as a BBC athletics commentator and pundit began with the 2004 Athens Olympics. Since then he has been a regular member of the BBC team covering athletics events.

He is a Director of multimedia production company Red Shoes, along with fellow Director and former BBC Executive Producer Richard Owen. Their clients include the IAAF and UEFA.

Jackson, who is of Jamaican descent, was the subject of an episode of the BBC TV genealogy series Who Do You Think You Are?, broadcast in the UK on 20 September 2006. Genetic tests showed his ancestry to be 55% African, 7% Native American (believed to be from Jamaican Maroon ancestry on his father's side), and 38% European. His mother was born in Panama, the daughter of Richard Augustus Packer and Gladys McGowan Campbell. Gladys Campbell was from Jamaica, the daughter of a Scottish man Duncan Campbell and his housemaid Albertina Wallace.

In March 2007 Jackson starred as the 'hidden celebrity' in an episode of the award-winning CBBC gameshow Hider in the House, hosted by JK and Joel.

In 2008, Jackson co-hosted, with Louise Minchin, the Sunday morning show Sunday Life on BBC One.

Colin Jackson appeared in the BBC One documentary The Making of Me on 31 July 2008, which attempted to find out what had made him such a talented athlete. A sample of his leg muscle showed that he had 25% super-fast twitch fibres, when all previous athletes tested had only 2%. Family support was also thought to have been highly significant. Jamaicans are notable for the high level of support and encouragement they give their children in the area of sports. One clip showed a stadium in Jamaica with 30,000 people cheering on children taking part in an average school sports meet. Supporters included their peers, who seemed happy to cheer on their classmates who were 'good at sports'. Although Jackson was brought up in the UK, he remembers his parents cheering on Don Quarrie in the 1976 Olympics, inspiring him to want to 'be like that'.

In 2009 Jackson shared his writing tips on the adult learning website "BBC raw words". He features in a comedy short with Nina Wadia, Rowland Rivron and Anneka Rice about structuring a story, and also shares his writing tips gained from writing Life's New Hurdles.

In July 2010, Jackson was a competitor on the BBC television programme Celebrity MasterChef.

In 2012 Jackson made a cameo appearance as himself in an episode of the UK TV comedy drama Stella. In 2015, he starred in the historical experience 24 Hours in the Past.

In February 2019 Jackson was inaugurated as a Chancellor of Wrexham Glyndwr University, after being awarded with an Honorary Fellowship in 2016 for his contribution to sport.

Strictly Come Dancing 
In 2005, he appeared as one of the celebrity contestants on the BBC TV series Strictly Come Dancing, where he came second with his dance partner Erin Boag, just losing out to cricketer Darren Gough. In 2006 Jackson became the first competitor who had not won the main series to win the Strictly Come Dancing Christmas Special.

Go Dad Run 

In 2013 Jackson created his own charitable fundraising event for men, Go Dad Run. The purpose is to raise awareness of men's health issues and funds for male based charities Prostate Cancer UK, Bowel Cancer UK, Orchid and CALM plus local Cancer Care charities and hospices. Ambassadors include Mark Foster, Donovan Bailey, Suzanne Packer, Fernando Montano, Siân Lloyd and Jamie Baulch.

Sport 4 Kids 

Jackson CBE joined Sport4Kids (S4K) as their International Director and Brand Ambassador.

Jackson holds special responsibilities for developing the S4K brand and help the mission to transform children's sport across the UK and international markets through the company's franchise network.

In 2020 Jackson joined other celebrities in a new S4C television series called  ('Language Road Trip') in which they take a crash course in the Welsh language while travelling around Wales. At the end of the series he was interviewed in Welsh. The series was broadcast in April 2020. An extra episode,  ('Language Road Trip: Christmas') was broadcast at the end of 2020, interviewing each of the celebrities about whether they were still making use of their Welsh and the opportunities they had had to use Welsh during lockdown.

Dancing on Ice
In 2021, Jackson participated in the thirteenth series of Dancing on Ice. He was partnered with Klabera Komini and finished in 3rd Place.

Personal life 
On 26 August 2017 Jackson came out as gay in a clip on Swedish television promoting the series "Rainbow Heroes". Previously he had denied that he was gay both in his 2004 autobiography and in a 2008 interview with The Voice newspaper.

International competitions

1Did not start in the semifinals

Personal bests
Outdoor
 110 metres hurdles – 12.91 sec (1993), former world record and current European record
 200 metres hurdles – 22.63 sec (1991)
 100 metres – 10.29 sec (1990)
 200 metres – 21.19 sec (1988)
 High jump –  (1982)
 Long jump –  (1985)

Indoor
 50 metres hurdles – 6.40 sec (1999), current British record
 60 metres hurdles – 7.30 sec (1994), former world record
 110 metres hurdles – 13.40 sec (2003)
 60 metres – 6.49 sec (1994), former European record
 All information from IAAF profile.

References

Bibliography 
 Colin Jackson: The Autobiography (BBC Books, 2003)

External links 
 
 BBC Hall of Fame profile 
 Speaker profile of Colin Jackson
 Agent's biography
 Sunday Morning with Colin Jackson and Suzanne Packer (BBC Radio Wales)

Living people
1967 births
AAA Championships winners
Athletes (track and field) at the 1986 Commonwealth Games
Athletes (track and field) at the 1988 Summer Olympics
Athletes (track and field) at the 1990 Commonwealth Games
Athletes (track and field) at the 1992 Summer Olympics
Athletes (track and field) at the 1994 Commonwealth Games
Athletes (track and field) at the 1996 Summer Olympics
Athletes (track and field) at the 2000 Summer Olympics
Athletes (track and field) at the 2002 Commonwealth Games
Black British sportsmen
British male sprinters
British male hurdlers
British sportspeople of Jamaican descent
Commanders of the Order of the British Empire
Commonwealth Games gold medallists for Wales
Commonwealth Games silver medallists for Wales
Commonwealth Games medallists in athletics
Commonwealth Games gold medallists in athletics
Competitors at the 1994 Goodwill Games
Cool Cymru
European Athletics Championships medalists
European Athletics Championships winners
European Athletics Indoor Championships winners
European Athlete of the Year winners
Gay sportsmen
Goodwill Games medalists in athletics
IAAF Continental Cup winners
World Athletics indoor record holders
LGBT Black British people
Welsh LGBT sportspeople
LGBT track and field athletes
Medalists at the 1988 Summer Olympics
Olympic athletes of Great Britain
Olympic male hurdlers
Olympic silver medallists for Great Britain
Olympic silver medalists in athletics (track and field)
People of Jamaican Maroon descent
Sportspeople from Cardiff
Team Bath track and field athletes
UK Athletics Championships winners
Welsh male hurdlers
Welsh male sprinters
Welsh people of Jamaican descent
Welsh people of Scottish descent
Welsh people of Taíno descent
Welsh Olympic medallists
World Athletics Championships athletes for Great Britain
World Athletics Championships medalists
World Athletics Championships winners
World Athletics Indoor Championships medalists
World Athletics Indoor Championships winners
World Athletics U20 Championships winners
World record setters in athletics (track and field)
British television presenters
Welsh television presenters
21st-century LGBT people
Medallists at the 1986 Commonwealth Games
Medallists at the 1990 Commonwealth Games
Medallists at the 1994 Commonwealth Games
Medallists at the 2002 Commonwealth Games